The Meysey-Thompson Baronetcy, of Kirby Hall in the County of York, was a title in the Baronetage of the United Kingdom. It was created on 26 March 1874 for Harry Meysey-Thompson, Liberal member of parliament for Whitby. He was succeeded by his son, the second Baronet. He was a Liberal, and later Liberal Unionist politician. On 26 December 1905 he was created Baron Knaresborough, of Kirby Hall (near Great Ouseburn) in the County of York, in the Peerage of the United Kingdom. The barony became extinct on his death in 1929 while the baronetcy survived. The presumed fourth Baronet never successfully proved his succession and was never on the Official Roll of the Baronetage. When he died in 2002 the baronetcy became extinct as well.

Meysey-Thompson baronets, of Kirby Hall (1874)
Sir Harry Stephen Meysey-Thompson, 1st Baronet (1809–1874)
Sir Henry Meysey Meysey-Thompson, 2nd Baronet (1845–1929) (created Baron Knaresborough in 1905)

Barons Knaresborough (1905)
Henry Meysey Meysey-Thompson, 1st Baron Knaresborough (1845–1929)

Meysey-Thompson baronets, of Kirby Hall (1874; Reverted)
Sir Algar de Clifford Charles Meysey-Thompson, 3rd Baronet (1885–1967)
(Humphrey) Simon Meysey-Thompson, presumed 4th Baronet (1935–2002)

References

Sources

Kidd, Charles, Williamson, David (editors). Debrett's Peerage and Baronetage (1990 edition). New York: St Martin's Press, 1990, 

Meysey-Thompson